is a role-playing video game developed by Pokelabo for Android and iOS. The game is directed by Yoko Taro, better known for his work in the NieR and Drakengard series. The game was released in Japan by Square Enix in June 2017, and worldwide by Pokelabo in July 2020.

Plot
In a world called Library filled with countless stories, the Characters within each story wish to revive their author for their desired future. To do so, they work together to gather inochi and fight the Nightmares that devour stories, knowing they will inevitably have to kill each other to get their wish.

Development 
The game was originally supposed to be published by Nexon outside of Japan but was delayed indefinitely due to localisation reasons. The game's publishing was then handed over to Pokelabo. The game's soundtrack was scored by Keiichi Okabe, Keigo Hoashi, and Shotaro Seo.

Reception 

The game received a "mixed or average" rating according to review aggregator Metacritic.

Hardcore Droid gave the title 2.5 stars out of 5, concluding, "Amazing visuals and audio can’t make up for the stale story lines and over-complicated class system. However, the wave style combat mode saves the day with its unique monsters and stylish attacks." Noisy Pixel gave the game a 7 out of 10 and wrote, "SINoALICE gives us a rather gripping narrative...Unfortunately, that same genius isn’t found in the battle system outside of the standout online Guild Battles."

Manga adaptation
A manga adaptation, illustrated by himiko, started serialization on the MangaUp! service in 2019. In July 2021, Square Enix announced they licensed the manga for English publication.

Notes

References

External links 
 

2017 video games
2019 manga
Android (operating system) games
IOS games
Gacha games
Gangan Comics manga
Role-playing video games
Square Enix games
Video games developed in Japan
Video games scored by Keiichi Okabe